is a Japanese businessman and personal computer pioneer.

Nishi's father ran a private school. Nishi attended Waseda University but dropped out to help found the first Japanese computer magazine, I/O. Shortly thereafter he launched ASCII magazine (a Japanese equivalent of Byte or Creative Computing) and, in 1978, ASCII Corporation, which began by making a rough translation from English to Japanese of the game Wizardry. He wanted to lead the personal computer market, but ASCII Corporation didn't have enough capital to develop personal computers. He knew Microsoft BASIC was becoming the industry standard in North America, and conceived selling it to Japanese companies. At 1978 National Computer Conference, he met and got along with Microsoft founder Bill Gates.

In Japan, Nishi worked with NEC on developing the PC-8001, an early consumer-ready personal computer not requiring assembly, which became a standard in Japan, and was involved in the design of the Kyotronic 85 which, sold to Radio Shack, became the TRS-80 Model 100, an early laptop computer.

Nishi's relationship with Bill Gates helped ASCII Corporation to grow. MSX, a new personal computer format, was jointly developed by Microsoft and ASCII Corporation for the Japanese market. But Nishi and Gates fell out, the partnership was dissolved in 1986, and Microsoft set up its own Japanese software subsidiary. But ASCII Corporation continued to thrive.

Under Nishi's direction, ASCII Corporation invested heavily in American startups in the electronics industry. By 1992 ASCII Corporation was heavily in debt and its stock price collapsed. At the direction of the Ministry of International Trade and Industry, the Industrial Bank of Japan and other banks bailed out the company, which rebounded.

ASCII Corporation became a subsidiary of Kadokawa Group Holdings in 2004, and merged with another Kadokawa subsidiary MediaWorks on April 1, 2008, and became ASCII Media Works.

After 1986, Nishi wrote for newspapers and authored a number of books. He sat in several committees on behalf of the Ministry of Posts and Telecommunications and of the Ministry of International Trade and Industry, and he is a member of the Committee for World Economy in the 21st Century. Nishi is the president of MSX Association, a private organization originating from an assembly of people with affinity with the MSX standard, and the president of Digital do MaiN, audio engineering company.

In 2005, Nishi ran unsuccessfully for president of a small university in rural Japan.

References

1956 births
Living people
Japanese businesspeople
People from Kobe